The Wilkes-Barre/Scranton Knights are a junior ice hockey organization from Pittston, Pennsylvania. In 2015, the Knights' junior hockey organization purchased the dormant Dawson Creek Rage franchise in the Tier II North American Hockey League (NAHL) and placed their Tier III franchise in the Eastern Hockey League into dormancy. The organization has reactivated and deactivated their Tier III level teams at various times, but plans to launch teams in the United States Premier Hockey League's Premier and Elite Divisions, non-USA Hockey sanctioned leagues that operate similar to the Tier III level. The organization also has several youth ice hockey teams in its development program.

The players, ages 16–20, carry amateur status and hope to earn a spot on higher level of junior hockey teams in the United States and Canada, Canadian Major Junior teams, collegiate teams, and eventually professional teams.

History

AJHL/EHL years (2010–2015)
From 2005 to 2010, the Tier III franchise was operated by an organization in Binghamton, New York, as the Binghamton Jr. Senators at the Chenango Ice Rink in the Atlantic Junior Hockey League (AJHL). In 2010, the franchise was transferred to an organization to the Wilkes-Barre/Scranton Knights that had been operating as a youth organization formed in 2005. After relocating, the organization also began a team at the Junior B level in the Metropolitan Junior Hockey League as well as youth hockey select teams at the Midget U18, Midget 16U, Bantam, Peewee, and Squirt and Mite levels. Along with Revolution Ice Centre in Pittston, Pennsylvania, the Knights also practiced at Revolution Training Centre in Dunmore, Pennsylvania. The training center has two skating surfaces: one synthetic ice and the other is an 85 x 45 ice surface.

The Knights won the AJHL Championship during the 2012–13 season in the best of three series against the Northern Cyclones and earned the AJHL President's Cup. The Knights lost the first game of the series 0–2 but came back to win the final two games. During the last game, the Cyclones had a 2–1 lead, but Knights forward Matt Cessna tied the game at 2–2 with 22 seconds remaining in the third period. With four minutes remaining in the first overtime, Cessna also scored the game-winner and was named the Most Valuable Player of the playoff championship series. The Knights' 2012–13 AJHL championship team featured team captain Jack Ceglarski (grandson of Len Ceglarski) and defenceman Oscar Nyquist (brother of Gustav Nyquist).

In 2013, Tier III junior hockey leagues underwent a large reorganization and the AJHL re-branded as the Eastern Hockey League (EHL).

NAHL years (2015–2020)

On May 1, 2015, it was announced that the Knights had purchased the dormant Dawson Creek Rage franchise in the North American Hockey League and began play as a Tier II team in the 2015–16 NAHL season while also dropping their Tier III teams. The organization would re-add Tier III teams in the EHL in 2017. In 2019, the Tier III team left the EHL and joined the NAHL's Tier III league, the North American 3 Hockey League (NA3HL), but were removed from the league prior to playing a game.

On May 11, 2020, the Knights announced they had sold their franchise rights to an organization in Danbury, Connecticut, and became the Danbury Jr. Hat Tricks.

USPHL (2021–present)
In February 2021, the Knights announced they would be reactivating their junior teams in the Premier and Elite Divisions of the United States Premier Hockey League, an independently sanctioned league, in the 2021–22 season. During their first season in the USPHL, they announced they would be adding a tuition-free National Collegiate Development Conference (NCDC) team, the USPHL's equivalent of a Tier II league, for the 2022–23 season.

Season-by-season records

Alumni
The Knights/Jr. Senators franchise has produced a number of alumni playing in higher levels of junior hockey, NCAA Division I, Division III, ACHA college and professional programs, including:
 Jerry D'Amigo Toronto Maple Leafs 2009 NHL Entry Draft - Rensselaer Polytechnic Institute (ECAC Hockey)
Gianni Paolo – Actor most known for portraying Brayden Weston on the hit crime drama Power, and Power Book II: Ghost; Also known for MA, The Fosters, The Mick and Chance (TV series)

See also
Wilkes-Barre/Scranton Penguins

References

External links
 Official W-B/S Knights website
 Former W-B/S Knights website
 Championship Article 

Amateur ice hockey teams in Pennsylvania
Sports in the Scranton–Wilkes-Barre metropolitan area
North American Hockey League teams
Ice hockey clubs established in 2010
2010 establishments in Pennsylvania
Pittston, Pennsylvania